The Source is a live album by trumpeter Dizzy Gillespie recorded in Paris, France, in 1973 and first released on the French America label.

Reception
The Allmusic review stated: "This CD finds trumpeter Dizzy Gillespie at age 55, just beginning to slip. Gillespie plays well enough... Still, the edge is missing on these explorations of standards and recent originals".

Track listing
 "Manteca" (Gil Fuller, Dizzy Gillespie, Chano Pozo) - 13:30
 "Alone Together" (Howard Dietz, Arthur Schwartz) - 5:26
 "Brother "K"" (Gillespie) - 9:27
 "Wheatleigh Hall" (Gillespie) - 7:50

Personnel
Dizzy Gillespie - trumpet
Johnny Griffin - tenor saxophone (tracks 1 & 4)
Kenny Drew - piano
Niels-Henning Ørsted Pedersen - bass
Kenny Clarke - drums
Humberto Canto - conga drums

References 

America Records live albums
Dizzy Gillespie live albums
1973 live albums